Grorud is a rapid transit station on the Oslo Metro. Located between Ammerud and Romsås on Grorud Line, it serves the Grorud borough. The station is located on the south side of a tunnel entrance. Above the station is a small cluster of shops and a small bus terminal.

The station was the end station of the original section of the Grorud Line, which opened 16 October 1966, and remained the end station until it was extended to Rommen on 3 March 1974.

References

External links

Oslo Metro stations in Oslo
Railway stations opened in 1966
1966 establishments in Norway